Buffalo Forge, also known as the Forge Complex, is a historic iron forge complex and national historic district located near Glasgow, Rockbridge County, Virginia. The district encompasses 11 contributing buildings, 1 contributing site, and 3 contributing structures.  The manor house is known as Mount Pleasant and was built in two sections of similar stone construction.  The earlier section dates to about 1819, and the wing was added about 1830.  A frame wing was added in the late-19th century and a kitchen wing in the early-20th century.  The district also includes the contributing kitchen (c. 1820), two slave quarters (c. 1858), garage (c. 1940), spring house  / dairy (c. 1820), stone cabin (pre-1865), shed (pre-1900), stables / barn (pre-1865), corn crib (pre-1920), hen house (pre-1920), and the ruins of the merchant mill and mill race.  Iron production at Buffalo Forge ceased in the fall of 1868.

It was listed on the National Register of Historic Places in 2004.

References

Industrial buildings and structures on the National Register of Historic Places in Virginia
Historic districts on the National Register of Historic Places in Virginia
Federal architecture in Virginia
Gothic Revival architecture in Virginia
Houses in Rockbridge County, Virginia
National Register of Historic Places in Rockbridge County, Virginia
Slave cabins and quarters in the United States